Serilingampally is an Assembly legislative constituency of Telangana. It is one of 14 constituencies in Ranga Reddy district. It is part of Chevella Lok Sabha constituency. It is also one of the 24 constituencies of Greater Hyderabad Municipal Corporation.
 
Arekapudi Gandhi of Telangana Rashtra Samithi is currently representing the constituency.

Overview
It is a newly formed constituency, created just before the 2009 general election; as per Delimitation Act of 2002, it was formed from part of the Khairatabad Constituency. Areas like Madhapur, Gachibowli, Kondapur, Miyapur come under Serilingampally (Assembly constituency).

The Assembly Constituency presently comprises the following Mandals

The Delimitation of Parliamentary and Assembly Constituencies Order, 2008 by Election Commission of India

Members of Legislative Assembly

Election results

2018

2009

See also
 Serilingampally
 List of constituencies of Telangana Legislative Assembly

References

Assembly constituencies of Telangana
Ranga Reddy district